Behind The Player: Shannon Larkin is an Interactive Music Video featuring Godsmack drummer Shannon Larkin
. Released on November 1, 2008 by IMV, the DVD features Shannon giving in-depth drum lessons for how to play "Voodoo" and "Straight Out of Line" by Godsmack and an intimate behind-the scenes look at his life as a professional musician, including rare photos and video.  The DVD also includes Shannon jamming the two tracks with Godsmack bassist Robbie Merrill, as well as other bonus material.

IMV donates $.25 from the sale of each Behind the Player DVD to Little Kids Rock, an organization that gets instruments in the hands of underprivileged kids.

Contents
Behind The Player
Shannon talks about his background, influences and gear, including rare photos and video

"Voodoo" by Godsmack
Lesson: Shannon gives an in-depth drum lesson for how to play the song
Jam: Shannon jams the track with Godsmack bassist Robbie Merrill

"Straight Out of Line" by Godsmack
Lesson: Shannon gives an in-depth drum lesson for how to play the song
Jam: Shannon jams the track with Godsmack bassist Robbie Merrill

Special features
Godsmack: Live trailer
Little Kids Rock promotional video

Personnel

Produced By: Ken Mayer & Sean E Demott
Directed By: Leon Melas
Executive Producer: Rick Donaleshen
Associate Producer: Shane Hall
Director Of Photography: Ken Barrows
Sound Engineer: Tim Harkins
Edited By: Jeff Morose
Mixed By: Matt Chidgey & Cedrick Courtois
Graphics By: Thayer DeMay
Camera Operators: Mike Chateneuf, Kieth Mcnulty, Chris Shaw, Doug Cragoe
Technical Director: Tyler Bourns

Gaffer: John Parker
Assistant Director: Matt Pick
Production Assistant: Laine Proctor
Lighting And Grip: Mcnulty Nielson
Artist Hospitality: Sasha Mayer
Shot At: Korn's Elementree Studios
Special Guest: Robbie Merrill
Cover Photo By:
Video Courtesy Of: Rob Shanahan, Shane Hall, Universal Records, Yamaha, Toca Percussion
Photos Courtesy Of: Joes Testa, Neil Zlozower, Chad Lee, Shane Hall, Stephanie Pick

References

External links
Official website

Behind the Player